Kimbolton railway station was a railway station in Kimbolton, Cambridgeshire. The station and its line closed in 1959.

The journey from London St. Pancras took approximately three hours, and required a change of trains and a wait at Kettering. This journey was described by former Kimbolton School headmaster William Ingram as "long and wearisome", especially considering that the station was more than two miles away from the village centre.

References

External links
 Kimbolton station on navigable 1946 O. S. map

Disused railway stations in Cambridgeshire
Former Midland Railway stations
Railway stations in Great Britain opened in 1866
Railway stations in Great Britain closed in 1959
1866 establishments in England